Tan Jiubin (born 5 March 1955) is a Chinese engineer who is a professor at Harbin Institute of Technology, and an academician of the Chinese Academy of Engineering.

Biography 
Tan was born in Harbin, Heilongjiang, on 5 March 1955. He earned a bachelor's degree in 1982, a master's degree in 1987, and a doctor's degree in 1991, all from Harbin Institute of Technology.

Tan taught at his alma mater since 1982, what he was promoted to associate professor in 1991 and to full professor in 1995. In 1996, he became a visiting scholar at École Polytechnique Fédérale de Lausanne.

Honours and awards 
 1997 State Science and Technology Progress Award (Third Class)
 1999 State Science and Technology Progress Award (First Class)
 2002 State Science and Technology Progress Award (First Class)
 2005 State Science and Technology Progress Award (First Class)
 2006 State Technological Invention Award (First Class)
 2013 State Technological Invention Award (Second Class)
 2016 State Technological Invention Award (Second Class)
 27 November 2017 Member of the Chinese Academy of Engineering (CAE)

References 

1955 births
Living people
People from Harbin
Engineers from Heilongjiang
Harbin Institute of Technology alumni
Academic staff of Harbin Institute of Technology
Members of the Chinese Academy of Engineering